Ki Tisa, Ki Tissa, Ki Thissa, or Ki Sisa ( — Hebrew for "when you take," the sixth and seventh words, and first distinctive words in the parashah) is the 21st weekly Torah portion in the annual Jewish cycle of Torah reading and the ninth in the Book of Exodus. The parashah tells of building the Tabernacle, the incident of the Golden calf, the request of Moses for God to reveal God's Attributes, and how Moses became radiant.

The parashah constitutes . The parashah is the longest of the weekly Torah portions in the book of Exodus (although not the longest in the Torah, which is Naso), and is made up of 7,424 Hebrew letters, 2,002 Hebrew words, 139 verses, and 245 lines in a Torah scroll (Sefer Torah).

Jews read it on the 21st Sabbath after Simchat Torah, in the Hebrew month of Adar, corresponding to February or March in the secular calendar. Jews also read the first part of the parashah, regarding the half-shekel head tax, as the maftir Torah reading on the special Sabbath Shabbat Shekalim (as on March 1, 2014, when  was read along with parashah Pekudei). Jews read another part of the parashah, which addresses the Three Pilgrim Festivals, as the initial Torah reading on the third intermediate day (Chol HaMoed) of Passover. And Jews read a larger selection from the same part of the parashah, as the initial Torah reading on a Sabbath that falls on one of the intermediate days of Passover or Sukkot.

Readings
In traditional Sabbath Torah reading, the parashah is divided into seven readings (aliyot). In the Masoretic Text of the Tanakh (Hebrew Bible), Parashat Ki Tisa has ten "open portion" divisions (roughly equivalent to paragraphs, often abbreviated with the Hebrew letter  (peh)). Parashat Ki Tisa has several further subdivisions, called "closed portion" divisions (abbreviated with the Hebrew letter ) within the open portion divisions. The first three open portion divisions divide the long first reading, and the next three open portion divisions divide the long second reading. The seventh open portion corresponds to the short third reading, and the eighth open portion corresponds to the short fourth reading. The ninth open portion spans the fifth and sixth readings. And the tenth open portion begins in the seventh reading. Closed portion divisions further divide the first and second readings, and conclude the seventh reading.

First reading — Exodus 30:11–31:17
In the long first reading, God instructed Moses that when he took a census of the Israelites, each person 20 years old or older, regardless of wealth, should give a half-shekel offering. God told Moses to assign the proceeds to the service of the Tent of Meeting. The first open portion ends here.

In the continuation of the reading, God told Moses to place a copper laver between the Tent of Meeting and the altar, so that Aaron and the priests could wash their hands and feet in water when they entered the Tent of Meeting or approached the altar to burn a sacrifice, so that they would not die. The second open portion ends here.

In the continuation of the reading, God directed Moses to make a sacred anointing oil from choice spices — myrrh, cinnamon, cassia — and olive oil. God told Moses to use it to anoint the Tent of Meeting, the furnishings of the Tabernacle, and the priests. God told Moses to warn the Israelites not to copy the sacred anointing oil's recipe for lay purposes, at pain of exile. A closed portion ends here.

In the continuation of the reading, God directed Moses make sacred incense from herbs — stacte, onycha, galbanum, and frankincense — to burn in the Tent of Meeting. As with the anointing oil, God warned against making incense from the same recipe for lay purposes. Another closed portion ends here with the end of chapter .

As the reading continues in chapter , God informed Moses that God had endowed Bezalel of the Tribe of Judah with divine skill in every kind of craft. God assigned to him Oholiab of the Tribe of Dan and granted skill to all who are skillful, that they might make the furnishings of the Tabernacle, the priests' vestments, the anointing oil, and the incense. The third open portion ends here.

In the continuation of the reading, God told Moses to admonish the Israelites nevertheless to keep the Sabbath, on pain of death. The first reading and a closed portion end here.

Second reading — Exodus 31:18–33:11
In the long second reading, God gave Moses two stone tablets inscribed by the finger of God. Meanwhile, the people became impatient for the return of Moses, and implored Aaron to make them a god. Aaron told them to bring him their gold earrings, and he cast them in a mold and made a molten golden calf. They exclaimed, "This is your god, O Israel, who brought you out of the land of Egypt!" Aaron built an altar before the calf, and announced a festival of the Lord. The people offered sacrifices, ate, drank, and danced. The fourth open portion ends here.

In the continuation of the reading, God told Moses what the people had done, saying "let Me be, that My anger may blaze forth against them and that I may destroy them, and make of you a great nation." But Moses implored God not to do so, lest the Egyptians say that God delivered the people only to kill them off in the mountains. Moses called on God to remember Abraham, Isaac, and Jacob, and God's oath to make their offspring as numerous as the stars, and God renounced the planned punishment. The fifth open portion ends here.

In the continuation of the reading, Moses descended the mountain bearing the two Tablets. Joshua told Moses, "There is a cry of war in the camp," but Moses answered, "It is the sound of song that I hear!" When Moses saw the calf and the dancing, he became enraged and shattered the Tablets at the foot of the mountain. He burned the calf, ground it to powder, strewed it upon the water, and made the Israelites drink it. When Moses asked Aaron how he committed such a great sin, Aaron replied that the people asked him to make a god, so he hurled their gold into the fire, "and out came this calf!"
Seeing that Aaron had let the people get out of control, Moses stood in the camp gate and called, "Whoever is for the Lord, come here!" All the Levites rallied to Moses, and at his instruction killed 3,000 people, including brother, neighbor, and kin. Moses went back to God and asked for God either to forgive the Israelites or kill Moses too, but God insisted on punishing only the sinners, which God did by means of a plague. A closed portion ends here with the end of chapter .

As the reading continues in chapter , God dispatched Moses and the people to the Promised Land, but God decided not to go in their midst, for fear of destroying them on the way. Upon hearing this, the Israelites went into mourning. Now Moses would pitch the Tent of Meeting outside the camp, and Moses would enter to speak to God, face to face. The second reading and the sixth open portion end here.

Third reading — Exodus 33:12–16
In the short third reading, Moses asked God whom God would send with Moses to lead the people. Moses further asked God to let him know God's ways, that Moses might know God and continue in God's favor. And God agreed to lead the Israelites. Moses asked God not to make the Israelites move unless God were to go in the lead. The third reading and the seventh open portion end here.

Fourth reading — Exodus 33:17–23
In the short fourth reading, God agreed to lead them. Moses asked God to let him behold God's Presence. God agreed to make all God's goodness pass before Moses and to proclaim God's name and nature, but God explained that no human could see God's face and live. God instructed Moses to station himself on a rock, where God would cover him with God's hand until God had passed, at which point Moses could see God's back. The fourth reading and the eighth open portion end here with the end of chapter .

Fifth reading — Exodus 34:1–9
In the fifth reading, in chapter , God directed Moses to carve two stone tablets like the ones that Moses shattered, so that God might inscribe upon them the words that were on the first Tablets, and Moses did so.
God came down in a cloud and proclaimed: "The Lord! The Lord! A God compassionate and gracious, slow to anger, abounding in kindness and faithfulness, extending kindness to the thousandth generation, forgiving iniquity, transgression, and sin; yet He does not remit all punishment, but visits the iniquity of parents upon children and children's children, upon the third and fourth generations." Moses bowed low and asked God to accompany the people in their midst, to pardon the people's iniquity, and to take them for God's own. The fifth reading ends here.

Sixth reading — Exodus 34:10–26
In the sixth reading, God replied by making a covenant to work unprecedented wonders and to drive out the peoples of the Promised Land. God warned Moses against making a covenant with them, lest they become a snare and induce the Israelites' children to lust after their gods. God commanded that the Israelites not make molten gods, that they consecrate or redeem every first-born, that they observe the Sabbath, that they observe the Three Pilgrim Festivals, that they not offer sacrifices with anything leavened, that they not leave the Passover lamb lying until morning, that they bring choice first fruits to the house of the Lord, and that they not boil a kid in its mother's milk. The sixth reading and the ninth open portion end here.

Seventh reading — Exodus 34:27–35

In the seventh reading, Moses stayed with God 40 days and 40 nights, ate no bread, drank no water, and wrote down on the Tablets the terms of the covenant. As Moses came down from the mountain bearing the two Tablets, the skin of his face was radiant, and the Israelites shrank from him. Moses called them near and instructed them concerning all that God had commanded.

In the maftir reading of  that concludes the parashah, when Moses finished speaking, he put a veil over his face. Whenever Moses spoke with God, Moses would take his veil off. And when he came out, he would tell the Israelites what he had been commanded, and then Moses would then put the veil back over his face again. The parashah and the final closed portion end here with the end of chapter .

Readings according to the triennial cycle
Jews who read the Torah according to the triennial cycle of Torah reading read the parashah according to the following schedule:

In ancient parallels
The parashah has parallels in these ancient sources:

Exodus chapter 31
Noting that Sargon of Akkad was the first to use a seven-day week, Gregory Aldrete speculated that the Israelites may have adopted the idea from the Akkadian Empire.

Exodus chapter 33
Similarly, the Middle Egyptian (early second millennium BCE) tale of Sinuhe Palestine described the Land of Israel or, as the Egyptian tale called it, the land of Yaa: "It was a good land called Yaa. Figs were in it and grapes. It had more wine than water. Abundant was its honey, plentiful its oil. All kind of fruit were on its trees. Barley was there and emmer, and no end of cattle of all kinds."

In inner-Biblical interpretation
The parashah has parallels or is discussed in these Biblical sources:

Exodus chapters 25–39
This is the pattern of instruction and construction of the Tabernacle and its furnishings:

As the creation story unfolds in seven days, the instructions about the Tabernacle unfold in seven speeches. In both creation and Tabernacle accounts, the text notes the completion of the task. In both creation and Tabernacle, the work done is seen to be good. In both creation and Tabernacle, when the work is finished, God takes an action in acknowledgement. In both creation and Tabernacle, when the work is finished, a blessing is invoked. And in both creation and Tabernacle, God declares something "holy."

Martin Buber and others noted that the language used to describe the building of the Tabernacle parallels that used in the story of creation. Jeffrey Tigay noted that the lampstand held seven candles, Aaron wore seven sacral vestments, the account of the building of the Tabernacle alludes to the creation account, and the Tabernacle was completed on New Year's Day. And Carol Meyers noted that  and  list seven kinds of substances — metals, yarn, skins, wood, oil, spices, and gemstones — signifying the totality of supplies.

Exodus chapter 31
2 Chronicles  reports that the bronze altar, which  reports Bezalel made, still stood before the Tabernacle in Solomon's time, and Solomon sacrificed a thousand burnt offerings on it.

The Sabbath
 refers to the Sabbath. Commentators note that the Hebrew Bible repeats the commandment to observe the Sabbath 12 times.

 reports that on the seventh day of Creation, God finished God’s work, rested, and blessed and hallowed the seventh day.

The Sabbath is one of the Ten Commandments.  commands that one remember the Sabbath day, keep it holy, and not do any manner of work or cause anyone under one’s control to work, for in six days God made heaven and earth and rested on the seventh day, blessed the Sabbath, and hallowed it.  commands that one observe the Sabbath day, keep it holy, and not do any manner of work or cause anyone under one’s control to work — so that one’s subordinates might also rest — and remember that the Israelites were servants in the land of Egypt, and God brought them out with a mighty hand and by an outstretched arm.

And God told Moses to let no one go out of one’s place on the seventh day.

In , just before giving Moses the second Tablets of Stone, God commanded that the Israelites keep and observe the Sabbath throughout their generations, as a sign between God and the children of Israel forever, for in six days God made heaven and earth, and on the seventh day God rested.

In , just before issuing the instructions for the Tabernacle, Moses again told the Israelites that no one should work on the Sabbath, specifying that one must not kindle fire on the Sabbath.

In , God told Moses to repeat the Sabbath commandment to the people, calling the Sabbath a holy convocation.

The prophet Isaiah taught in  that iniquity is inconsistent with the Sabbath. In , the prophet taught that if people turn away from pursuing or speaking of business on the Sabbath and call the Sabbath a delight, then God will make them ride upon the high places of the earth and will feed them with the heritage of Jacob.

The prophet Jeremiah taught in  that the fate of Jerusalem depended on whether the people abstained from work on the Sabbath, refraining from carrying burdens outside their houses and through the city gates.

The prophet Ezekiel told in  how God gave the Israelites God’s Sabbaths, to be a sign between God and them, but the Israelites rebelled against God by profaning the Sabbaths, provoking God to pour out God’s fury upon them, but God stayed God’s hand.

In , Nehemiah told how he saw some treading winepresses on the Sabbath, and others bringing all manner of burdens into Jerusalem on the Sabbath day, so when it began to be dark before the Sabbath, he commanded that the city gates be shut and not opened till after the Sabbath and directed the Levites to keep the gates to sanctify the Sabbath.

Exodus chapter 32

1 Kings  reports a parallel story of golden calves. King Jeroboam of the northern Kingdom of Israel made two calves of gold out of a desire to prevent the kingdom from returning to allegiance to the house of David and the southern Kingdom of Judah. In , the people said of the Golden Calf, "This is your god, O Israel, that brought you up out of the land of Egypt." Jeroboam set up one of the calves in Bethel, and the other in Dan, and the people went to worship before the calf in Dan. Jeroboam made houses of high places, and made priests from people who were not Levites. He ordained a feast like Sukkot on the fifteenth day of the eighth month (a month after the real Sukkot), and he went up to the altar at Bethel to sacrifice to the golden calves that he had made, and he installed his priests there.

Exodus chapter 34

James Limburg asked whether the Book of Jonah might be a Midrash on a text like .

Sommer argued that , for example, quoted , which was already an authoritative and holy text, but revised the morally troubling part: Where  taught that God punishes sin for generations,  maintained that God does not contend forever. Sommer argued that  and  similarly quoted  with revision. Rather, they repeat  while also disagreeing with part of it.

Passover
 refers to the Festival of Passover, calling it "the Feast of Unleavened Bread." In the Hebrew Bible, Passover is called:
"Passover";
"The Feast of Unleavened Bread"; and
"A holy convocation" or "a solemn assembly".

Some explain the double nomenclature of "Passover" and "Feast of Unleavened Bread" as referring to two separate feasts that the Israelites combined sometime between the Exodus and when the Biblical text became settled.  and  indicate that the dedication of the firstborn also became associated with the festival.

Some believe that the "Feast of Unleavened Bread" was an agricultural festival at which the Israelites celebrated the beginning of the grain harvest.

"Passover," on the other hand, was associated with a thanksgiving sacrifice of a lamb, also called "the Passover," "the Passover lamb," or "the Passover offering."

Some believe that the proximity of the dates of the two festivals led to their confusion and merger.

 and 27 link the word "Passover" to God's act to "pass over" the Israelites' houses in the plague of the firstborn. In the Torah, the consolidated Passover and Feast of Unleavened Bread thus commemorate the Israelites' liberation from Egypt.

The Hebrew Bible frequently notes the Israelites' observance of Passover at turning points in their history.  reports God's direction to the Israelites to observe Passover in the wilderness of Sinai on the anniversary of their liberation from Egypt.  reports that upon entering the Promised Land, the Israelites kept the Passover on the plains of Jericho and ate unleavened cakes and parched corn, produce of the land, the next day.  reports that King Josiah commanded the Israelites to keep the Passover in Jerusalem as part of Josiah's reforms, but also notes that the Israelites had not kept such a Passover from the days of the Biblical judges nor in all the days of the kings of Israel or the kings of Judah, calling into question the observance of even Kings David and Solomon. The more reverent , however, reports that Solomon offered sacrifices on the festivals, including the Feast of Unleavened Bread. And  reports King Hezekiah's observance of a second Passover anew, as sufficient numbers of neither the priests nor the people were prepared to do so before then. And  reports that the Israelites returned from the Babylonian captivity observed Passover, ate the Passover lamb, and kept the Feast of Unleavened Bread seven days with joy.

Shavuot
 refers to the Festival of Shavuot. In the Hebrew Bible, Shavuot is called:
The Feast of Weeks;
The Day of the First-fruits;
The Feast of Harvest; and
A holy convocation.

 associates Shavuot with the first-fruits of the wheat harvest. In turn,  set out the ceremony for the bringing of the first fruits.

To arrive at the correct date,  instructs counting seven weeks from the day after the day of rest of Passover, the day that they brought the sheaf of barley for waving. Similarly,  directs counting seven weeks from when they first put the sickle to the standing barley.

 sets out a course of offerings for the fiftieth day, including a meal-offering of two loaves made from fine flour from the first-fruits of the harvest; burnt-offerings of seven lambs, one bullock, and two rams; a sin-offering of a goat; and a peace-offering of two lambs. Similarly,  sets out a course of offerings including a meal-offering; burnt-offerings of two bullocks, one ram, and seven lambs; and one goat to make atonement.  directs a freewill-offering in relation to God's blessing.

 and  ordain a holy convocation in which the Israelites were not to work.

 reports that Solomon offered burnt-offerings on the Feast of Weeks.

Sukkot
And  refers to the Festival of Sukkot, calling it "the Feast of Ingathering." In the Hebrew Bible, Sukkot is called:
"The Feast of Tabernacles (or Booths)";
"The Feast of Ingathering";
"The Feast" or "the festival";
"The Feast of the Lord";
"The festival of the seventh month"; and
"A holy convocation" or "a sacred occasion."

Sukkot's agricultural origin is evident from the name "The Feast of Ingathering," from the ceremonies accompanying it, and from the season and occasion of its celebration: "At the end of the year when you gather in your labors out of the field"; "after you have gathered in from your threshing-floor and from your winepress." It was a thanksgiving for the fruit harvest. And in what may explain the festival's name, Isaiah reports that grape harvesters kept booths in their vineyards. Coming as it did at the completion of the harvest, Sukkot was regarded as a general thanksgiving for the bounty of nature in the year that had passed.

Sukkot became one of the most important feasts in Judaism, as indicated by its designation as "the Feast of the Lord" or simply "the Feast." Perhaps because of its wide attendance, Sukkot became the appropriate time for important state ceremonies. Moses instructed the children of Israel to gather for a reading of the Law during Sukkot every seventh year. King Solomon dedicated the Temple in Jerusalem on Sukkot. And Sukkot was the first sacred occasion observed after the resumption of sacrifices in Jerusalem after the Babylonian captivity.

In the time of Nehemiah, after the Babylonian captivity, the Israelites celebrated Sukkot by making and dwelling in booths, a practice of which Nehemiah reports: "the Israelites had not done so from the days of Joshua." In a practice related to that of the Four Species, Nehemiah also reports that the Israelites found in the Law the commandment that they "go out to the mountains and bring leafy branches of olive trees, pine trees, myrtles, palms and [other] leafy trees to make booths." In , God told Moses to command the people: "On the first day you shall take the product of  trees, branches of palm trees, boughs of leafy trees, and willows of the brook," and "You shall live in booths seven days; all citizens in Israel shall live in booths, in order that future generations may know that I made the Israelite people live in booths when I brought them out of the land of Egypt." The book of Numbers, however, indicates that while in the wilderness, the Israelites dwelt in tents. Some secular scholars consider  (the commandments regarding booths and the four species) to be an insertion by a later redactor.

King Jeroboam of the northern Kingdom of Israel, whom  describes as practicing "his evil way," celebrated a festival on the fifteenth day of the eighth month, one month after Sukkot, "in imitation of the festival in Judah." "While Jeroboam was standing on the altar to present the offering, the man of God, at the command of the Lord, cried out against the altar" in disapproval.

According to the prophet Zechariah, in the messianic era, Sukkot will become a universal festival, and all nations will make pilgrimages annually to Jerusalem to celebrate the feast there.

Milk

In early nonrabbinic interpretation
The parashah is discussed in these early nonrabbinic sources:

Exodus chapter 31
Josephus taught that when the Israelites brought together the materials with great diligence, Moses set architects over the works by the command of God. And these were the very same people that the people themselves would have chosen, had the election been allowed to them: Bezalel, the son of Uri, of the tribe of Judah, the grandson of Miriam, the sister of Moses, and Oholiab, file son of Ahisamach, of the tribe of Dan.

 told how in the 2nd century BCE, many followers of the pious Jewish priest Mattathias rebelled against the Seleucid king Antiochus IV Epiphanes. Antiochus’s soldiers attacked a group of them on the Sabbath, and when the Pietists failed to defend themselves so as to honor the Sabbath (commanded in, among other places), a thousand died.  reported that when Mattathias and his friends heard, they reasoned that if they did not fight on the Sabbath, they would soon be destroyed. So they decided that they would fight against anyone who attacked them on the Sabbath.

In classical rabbinic interpretation
The parashah is discussed in these rabbinic sources from the era of the Mishnah and the Talmud:

Exodus chapter 30
The Rabbis taught in a Baraita that upon entering a barn to measure the new grain one should recite the blessing, "May it be Your will O Lord, our God, that You may send blessing upon the work of our hands." Once one has begun to measure, one should say, "Blessed be the One who sends blessing into this heap." If, however, one first measured the grain and then recited the blessing, then prayer is in vain, because blessing is not to be found in anything that has been already weighed or measured or numbered, but only in a thing hidden from sight.

Rabbi Eleazar taught that God told David that David called God an inciter, but God would make David stumble over a thing that even school-children knew, namely, that which  says, "When you take the sum of the children of Israel according to their number, then shall they give every man a ransom for his soul into the Lord . . . that there be no plague among them." Forthwith, as  reports, "Satan stood up against Israel," and as  reports, "He stirred up David against them saying, 'Go, number Israel.'" And when David did number them, he took no ransom from them, and as  reports, "So the Lord sent a pestilence upon Israel from the morning even to the time appointed." The Gemara asked what  meant by "the time appointed." Samuel the elder, the son-in-law of Rabbi Hanina, answered in the name of Rabbi Hanina: From the time of slaughtering the continual offering (at dawn) until the time of sprinkling the blood. Rabbi Joḥanan said it meant at midday. So Abishai son of Zeruiah then died, and he was individually equal in worth to the greater part of the Sanhedrin. Reading , "And as he was about to destroy, the Lord beheld, and He repented," the Gemara ask what God beheld. Rav said God beheld Jacob, as  reports, "And Jacob said when he beheld them." Samuel said that God beheld the ashes of the ram of Isaac, as  says, "God will see for Himself the lamb." Rabbi Isaac Nappaha taught that God saw the atonement money that  reports God required Moses to collect. Alternatively, Rabbi Joḥanan taught that God saw the Temple. For  explained the meaning of the name that Abraham gave to the mountain where Abraham nearly sacrificed Isaac to be, "In the mount where the Lord is seen." (Solomon later built the Temple on that mountain, and God saw the merit of the sacrifices there.) Rabbi Jacob bar Iddi and Rabbi Samuel bar Naḥmani differed on the matter. One said that God saw the atonement money that  reports God required Moses to collect from the Israelites, while the other said that God saw the Temple. The Gemara concluded that the more likely view was that God saw the Temple, as  can be read to say, "As it will be said on that day, 'in the mount where the Lord is seen.'"

Reading , "This they shall give . . . half a shekel for an offering to the Lord," to indicate that God pointed with God's finger, Rabbi Ishmael said that each of the five fingers of God's right hand appertain to the mystery of Redemption. With the index finger, God showed Moses what the children of Israel should give for the redemption of their souls, as  says, "This they shall give . . . half a shekel for an offering to the Lord." With the thumb and all the hand, God will in the future smite God's enemies (who Rabbi Ishmael identified as the children of Esau and Ishmael), as  says, "Let your hand be lifted up above your adversaries, and let all your enemies be cut off."

A Midrash taught that God considers studying the sanctuary’s structure as equivalent to rebuilding it.

Rabbi Jose the son of Rabbi Hanina taught that a priest was not permitted to wash in a laver that did not contain enough water to wash four priests, for  says, "That Moses and Aaron and his sons might wash their hands and their feet thereat." ("His sons" implies at least two priests, and adding Moses and Aaron makes four.)

The Mishnah reported that the High Priest Ben Katin made 12 spigots for the laver, where there had been two before. Ben Katin also made a machine for the laver, so that its water would not become unfit by remaining overnight.

The Mishnah taught that for these transgressions, one was liable to excision if one violated the commandment willfully. If one violated the commandment in error, one was liable to a sin offering. If there was a doubt whether one had violated the commandment, one was liable to a suspensive guilt offering, except, taught Rabbi Meir, in the case of one who defiled the Temple or its consecrated things, in which case one was liable to a sliding-scale sacrifice (according to the means of the transgressor, as provided in ).

Rabbi Judah taught that many miracles attended the anointing oil that Moses made in the wilderness. There were originally only 12  (about a gallon) of the oil. Much of it must have been absorbed in the mixing pot, much must have been absorbed in the roots of the spices used, and much of it must have evaporated during cooking. Yet it was used to anoint the Tabernacle and its vessels, Aaron and his sons throughout the seven days of the consecration, and subsequent High Priests and kings. The Gemara calculated the numerical value of the Hebrew letters in the word ,  ("this") to be 12 (employing Gematria, where  equals 7 and  equals 5), indicating that 12 logs of the oil were preserved throughout time.

Exodus chapter 31
Rabbi Joḥanan taught that God proclaims three things for God's Self: famine, plenty, and a good leader.  shows that God proclaims famine, when it says: "The Lord has called for a famine."  shows that God proclaims plenty, when it says: "I will call for the corn and will increase it." And  shows that God proclaims a good leader, when it says: "And the Lord spoke to Moses, saying, 'See I have called by name Bezalel, the son of Uri.'" Rabbi Isaac taught that we cannot appoint a leader over a community without first consulting the people, as  says: "And Moses said to the children of Israel: 'See, the Lord has called by name Bezalel, the son of Uri.'" Rabbi Isaac taught that God asked Moses whether Moses considered Bezalel suitable. Moses replied that if God thought Bezalel suitable, surely Moses must also. God told Moses that, all the same, Moses should go and consult the people. Moses then asked the Israelites whether they considered Bezalel suitable. They replied that if God and Moses considered Bezalel suitable, then surely they had to, as well. When God told Moses (in ) to tell Bezalel to make a tabernacle, an ark, and vessels, Moses reversed the order and told Bezalel to make an ark, vessels, and a tabernacle. Bezalel replied to Moses that as a rule, one first builds a house and then brings vessels into it, but Moses directed to make an ark, vessels, and a tabernacle. Bezalel asked where he would put the vessels. And Bezalel asked whether God had told Moses to make a tabernacle, an ark, and vessels. Moses replied that perhaps Bezalel had been in the shadow of God and had thus come to know this. Rav Judah taught in the name of Rav that  indicated that God endowed Bezalel with the same attribute that God used in creating the universe. Rav Judah said in the name of Rav that Bezalel knew how to combine the letters by which God created the heavens and earth. For  says (about Bezalel), "And He has filled him with the spirit of God, in wisdom and in understanding, and in knowledge," and  says (about creation), "The Lord by wisdom founded the earth; by understanding He established the heavens," and  says, "By His knowledge the depths were broken up."

Rabbi Tanḥuma taught in the name of Rav Huna that even the things that Bezalel did not hear from Moses he conceived of on his own exactly as they were told to Moses from Sinai. For  does not say, "that Moses commanded him," but, "that the Lord commanded Moses."

And the Agadat Shir ha-Shirim taught that Bezalel and Oholiab went up Mount Sinai, where the heavenly Sanctuary was shown to them.

The Gemara posited that perhaps  refers to willful desecration. The Gemara answered that  is not needed to teach that willful transgression of the Sabbath is a capital crime, for  says, "Whoever does any work therein shall be put to death." The Gemara concluded that  thus must apply to an unwitting offender, and in that context, the words "shall surely be put to death" mean that the inadvertent Sabbath violator will "die" monetarily because of the violator's need to bring costly sacrifices.

But they did not know the correct form of death penalty for him, for God had not yet been specified what to do to him, as  says, "for it had not [yet] been specified what should be done to him." With regard to the blasphemer, the Sifra read , "until the decision of the Lord should be made clear to them," to indicate that they did not know whether or not the blasphemer was to be executed. (And if they placed the blasphemer together with the wood gatherer, it might have caused the blasphemer unnecessary fear, as he might have concluded that he was on death row. Therefore, they held the two separately.)

A Midrash asked to which commandment  refers when it says, "For if you shall diligently keep all this commandment that I command you, to do it, to love the Lord your God, to walk in all His ways, and to cleave to Him, then will the Lord drive out all these nations from before you, and you shall dispossess nations greater and mightier than yourselves." Rabbi Levi said that "this commandment" refers to the recitation of the Shema, but the Rabbis said that it refers to the Sabbath, which is equal to all the precepts of the Torah.

The Alphabet of Rabbi Akiva taught that when God was giving Israel the Torah, God told them that if they accepted the Torah and observed God's commandments, then God would give them for eternity a most precious thing that God possessed — the World To Come. When Israel asked to see in this world an example of the World To Come, God replied that the Sabbath is an example of the World To Come.

Rabbi Simeon ben Lakish (Resh Lakish) taught that the Torah that God gave Moses was of white fire and its writing of black fire. It was itself fire and it was hewn out of fire and completely formed of fire and given in fire, as  says, "At His right hand was a fiery law to them."

Rabbi Samuel bar Nahman taught that when God passed the two Tablets to Moses (as reported in ), the Tablets conveyed to Moses a lustrous appearance (as reported in ).
	

Rabbi Ishmael said that God wrote the Tablets of the Law with the middle finger, as  says, "And He gave to Moses, when He had made an end of communing with him . . . tables of stone, written with the finger of God."

Exodus chapter 32
A Baraita taught that because of God's displeasure with the Israelites, the north wind did not blow on them in any of the 40 years during which they wandered in the wilderness.

( mentions that Moses appointed Hur to share the leadership of the people with Aaron, but after Moses descended from Mount Sinai, Hur's name does not appear again.) Aaron thought it better to let the people worship the Golden Calf, for which they might yet find forgiveness through repentance. And thus Rabbi Tanḥum bar Hanilai concluded that it was in reference to Aaron's decision-making in this incident that  can be read to mean, "He who praises one who makes a compromise blasphemes God."

The Sages told that Aaron really intended to delay the people until Moses came down, but when Moses saw Aaron beating the Golden Calf into shape with a hammer, Moses thought that Aaron was participating in the sin and was incensed with him. So God told Moses that God knew that Aaron's intentions were good. The Midrash compared it to a prince who became mentally unstable and started digging to undermine his father's house. His tutor told him not to weary himself but to let him dig. When the king saw it, he said that he knew the tutor's intentions were good, and declared that the tutor would rule over the palace. And Aaron told them that since he was a priest, they should let him make it and sacrifice to it, all with the intention of delaying them until Moses could come down. So God told Aaron that God knew Aaron's intention, and that only Aaron would have sovereignty over the sacrifices that the Israelites would bring. The Midrash told that God told this to Moses several months later in the Tabernacle itself when Moses was about to consecrate Aaron to his office. Rabbi Levi compared it to the friend of a king who was a member of the imperial cabinet and a judge. When the king was about to appoint a palace governor, he told his friend that he intended to appoint the friend's brother. And when God was about to appoint a High Priest, God notified Moses that it would be his brother Aaron.

Similarly, the Midrash noted that  says that in the incident of the spies, "the men . . . when they returned, made all the congregation to murmur against him." The Midrash explained that that is why the report of  about the daughters of Zelophehad follows immediately after the report of  about the death of the wilderness generation. The Midrash noted that  says, "there was not left a man of them, save Caleb the son of Jephunneh," because the men had been unwilling to enter the Land. But the Midrash taught that  says, "then drew near the daughters of Zelophehad," to show that the women still sought an inheritance in the Land. The Midrash taught that in that generation, the women built up fences that the men broke down.

The Pirke De-Rabbi Eliezer expounded on the exchange between God and Moses in  after the sin of the Golden Calf. The Pirke De-Rabbi Eliezer told that after the incident of the Golden Calf, God told Moses that the Israelites had forgotten God's might and had made an idol. But Moses noted that once the Israelites had sinned, God told Moses (in ), "Go, get down, for your people have corrupted themselves." Moses told God that the Israelites were indeed God's people, and God's inheritance, as  reports Moses saying, "Yet they are Your people and Your inheritance."

Did the prayer of Moses in  change God's harsh decree? Rabbi Abbahu read  to teach that God rules humankind, but the righteous rule God, for God makes a decree, and the righteous may through their prayer annul it.

Rava employed  to interpret , which says: "And Moses besought the Lord his God" in connection with the incident of the Golden Calf. Rava noted that  uses the term "besought", while  uses the similar term "break" in connection with vows. Similarly, Rabbi Berekiah taught in the name of Rabbi Helbo in the name of Rabbi Isaac that Moses absolved God of God's vow. When the Israelites made the Golden Calf, Moses began to persuade God to forgive them, but God explained to Moses that God had already taken an oath in  that "he who sacrifices to the gods . . . shall be utterly destroyed," and God could not retract an oath. So Moses wrapped himself in his cloak and adopted the posture of a sage, and God stood before Moses as one asking for the annulment of a vow.

Rav Huna and Rav Hisda were discussing how long to wait between recitations of the Amidah prayer if one erred in the first reciting and needed to repeat the prayer.

A Midrash compared Noah to Moses and found Moses superior. While Noah was worthy to be delivered from the generation of the Flood, he saved only himself and his family, and had insufficient strength to deliver his generation. Moses, however, saved both himself and his generation when they were condemned to destruction after the sin of the Golden Calf, as  reports, "And the Lord repented of the evil that He said He would do to His people." The Midrash compared the cases to two ships in danger on the high seas, on board of which were two pilots. One saved himself but not his ship, and the other saved both himself and his ship.

Interpreting  on the "tablets that were written on both their sides," Rav Chisda said that the writing of the Tablets was cut completely through the Tablets, so that it could be read from either side. Thus the letters mem and samekh, which each form a complete polygon, left some of the stone Tablets in the middle of those letters standing in the air where they were held stable only by a miracle.

Joshua told Moses (in ), "There is a noise of war in the camp." But Moses retorted (in ), "It is not the voice of them that shout for mastery; neither is it the voice of them that cry for being overcome, but the noise of them that sing do I hear." Rabbi Samuel bar Nahman interpreted the words, "but the noise of them that sing do I hear," to mean that Moses heard the noise of reproach and blasphemy. The men of the Great Assembly noted that  reports, "They had made a molten calf, and said: 'This is your God that brought you up out of Egypt.'" That would be sufficient provocation, but  continues, "And wrought great provocations." The men of the Great Assembly thus concluded that  demonstrates that in addition to making the Golden Calf, on that occasion the Israelites also uttered reproaches and blasphemy.

A Midrash explained why Moses broke the stone Tablets. When the Israelites committed the sin of the Golden Calf, God sat in judgment to condemn them, as  says, "Let Me alone, that I may destroy them," but God had not yet condemned them. So Moses took the Tablets from God to appease God's wrath. The Midrash compared the act of Moses to that of a king's marriage-broker. The king sent the broker to secure a wife for the king, but while the broker was on the road, the woman corrupted herself with another man. The broker (who was entirely innocent) took the marriage document that the king had given the broker to seal the marriage and tore it, reasoning that it would be better for the woman to be judged as an unmarried woman than as a wife.

(Thus, for the sake of the original two Tablets, Israel would have remained forever free.)

Resh Lakish interpreted this to mean that God gave Moses strength because he broke the Tablets.

The Rabbis taught that  and  bear out Ecclesiastes , "A time to cast away stones, and a time to gather stones together." The Rabbis taught that  refers to Moses.

Reading the report of  that Moses "took the calf . . . ground it to powder, and sprinkled it on the water, and made the children of Israel drink it," the Sages interpreted that Moses meant to test the Israelites much as the procedure of  tested a wife accused of adultery.

A Midrash noted that Israel sinned with fire in making the Golden Calf, as  says, "And I cast it into the fire, and there came out this calf." And then Bezalel came and healed the wound (and the construction of the Tabernacle made atonement for the sins of the people in making the Golden Calf). The Midrash taught that Bezalel was the smith whom God had created to address the fire. And the Midrash likened it to the case of a doctor's disciple who applied a plaster to a wound and healed it. When people began to praise him, his teacher, the doctor, said that they should praise the doctor, for he taught the disciple. Similarly, when everybody said that Bezalel had constructed the Tabernacle through his knowledge and understanding, God said that it was God who created him and taught him, as  says, "Behold, I have created the smith."

Rav Nahman bar Isaac derived from the words "if not, blot me, I pray, out of Your book that You have written" in  that three books are opened in heaven on Rosh Hashanah. Rav Kruspedai said in the name of Rabbi Joḥanan that on Rosh Hashanah, three books are opened in Heaven — one for the thoroughly wicked, one for the thoroughly righteous, and one for those in between. The thoroughly righteous are immediately inscribed definitively in the book of life. The thoroughly wicked are immediately inscribed definitively in the book of death. And the fate of those in between is suspended from Rosh Hashanah to Yom Kippur. If they deserve well, then they are inscribed in the book of life; if they do not deserve well, then they are inscribed in the book of death. Rabbi Abin said that  tells us this when it says, "Let them be blotted out of the book of the living, and not be written with the righteous." "Let them be blotted out from the book" refers to the book of the wicked. "Of the living" refers to the book of the righteous. "And not be written with the righteous" refers to the book of those in between. "Blot me, I pray" refers to the book of the wicked. "Out of Your book" refers to the book of the righteous. "That you have written" refers to the book of those in between. A Baraita taught that the House of Shammai said that there will be three groups at the Day of Judgment — one of thoroughly righteous, one of thoroughly wicked, and one of those in between. The thoroughly righteous will immediately be inscribed definitively as entitled to everlasting life; the thoroughly wicked will immediately be inscribed definitively as doomed to Gehinnom, as  says, "And many of them who sleep in the dust of the earth shall awake, some to everlasting life and some to reproaches and everlasting abhorrence." Those in between will go down to Gehinnom and scream and rise again, as  says, "And I will bring the third part through the fire, and will refine them as silver is refined, and will try them as gold is tried. They shall call on My name and I will answer them."

Exodus chapter 33
Reading , Rabbi Simlai taught that when the Israelites gave precedence to "we will do" over "we will hear," 600,000 ministering angels came and set two crowns on each Israelite man, one as a reward for "we will do" and the other as a reward for "we will hearken."

Once when Rami bar Ezekiel visited Bnei Brak, he saw goats grazing under fig trees while honey was flowing from the figs, and milk dripped from the goats mingling with the fig honey, causing him to remark that it was indeed a land flowing with milk and honey. Rabbi Jacob ben Dostai said that it is about three miles from Lod to Ono, and once he rose up early in the morning and waded all that way up to his ankles in fig honey. Resh Lakish said that he saw the flow of the milk and honey of Sepphoris extend over an area of sixteen miles by sixteen miles. Rabbah bar Bar Hana said that he saw the flow of the milk and honey in all the Land of Israel and the total area was equal to an area of twenty-two parasangs by six parasangs.

Rav Judah taught in the name of Rav that as Moses was dying, Joshua quoted back to Moses the report of  about how Joshua stood by the side of Moses all the time. Rav Judah reported in the name of Rav that when Moses was dying, he invited Joshua to ask him about any doubts that Joshua might have. Joshua replied by asking Moses whether Joshua had ever left Moses for an hour and gone elsewhere. But his servant Joshua the son of Nun departed not out of the Tabernacle." Joshua's words wounded Moses, and immediately the strength of Moses waned, and Joshua forgot 300 laws, and 700 doubts concerning laws arose in Joshua's mind. The Israelites then arose to kill Joshua (unless he could resolve these doubts). God then told Joshua that it was not possible to tell him the answers (for, as  tells, the Torah is not in Heaven). Instead, God then directed Joshua to occupy the Israelites' attention in war, as  reports.

Ben Damah the son of Rabbi Ishmael's sister once asked Rabbi Ishmael whether one who had studied the whole Torah might learn Greek wisdom. Rabbi Ishmael replied by reading to Ben Damah , "This book of the law shall not depart out of your mouth, but you shall meditate therein day and night." And then Rabbi Ishmael told Ben Damah to go find a time that is neither day nor night and learn Greek wisdom then. Rabbi Samuel bar Naḥmani, however, taught in the name of Rabbi Jonathan that  is neither duty nor command, but a blessing. For God saw that the words of the Torah were most precious to Joshua, as  says, "The Lord would speak to Moses face to face, as one man speaks to another. And he would then return to the camp. His minister Joshua, the son of Nun, a young man, departed not out of the tent." So God told Joshua that since the words of the Torah were so precious to him, God assured Joshua (in the words of ) that "this book of the law shall not depart out of your mouth." A Baraita was taught in the School of Rabbi Ishmael, however, that one should not consider the words of the Torah as a debt that one should desire to discharge, for one is not at liberty to desist from them.

And because Joshua served his master Moses, Joshua attained the privilege of receiving the Holy Spirit, as  reports, "Now it came to pass after the death of Moses . . . that the Lord spoke to Joshua, the minister of Moses."

Rav Nahman warned that one who is as skilled in refuting heretics as Rav Idit should do so, but others should not. Once a heretic asked Rav Idit why  says, "And to Moses He said, 'Come up to the Lord,'" when surely God should have said, "Come up to Me." But if so, the heretic retorted, we should worship Metatron. Rav Idit replied that  also says, "Be not rebellious against him," by which God meant, "Do not exchange Me for him" (as the word for "rebel," derives from the same root as the word "exchange"). The heretic then asked why then  says, "he will not pardon your transgression." Rav Idit answered that indeed Metatron has no authority to forgive sins, and the Israelites would not accept him even as a messenger, for  reports that Moses told God, "If Your Presence does not go with me, do not carry us up from here."

But Rabbi Samuel bar Naḥmani said in the name of Rabbi Jonathan that in compensation for three pious acts that Moses did at the burning bush, he was privileged to obtain three rewards.

Moses foretold that he would behold God's Glory and make atonement for the Israelites' iniquities on Yom Kippur. On that day, Moses asked God (in the words of ) "Show me, I pray, Your Glory." God told Moses that Moses was not able to see God's Glory lest he die, as  reports God said, "men shall not see Me and live," but for the sake of God's oath to Moses, God agreed to do as Moses asked. God instructed Moses to stand at the entrance of a cave, and God would cause all God's angels to pass before Moses. God told Moses to stand his ground, and not to fear, as  reports, "And He said, I will make all My Goodness pass before you." God told Moses that when he heard the Name that God had spoken to him, then Moses would know that God was before him, as  reports. The ministering angels complained that they served before God day and night, and they were unable to see God's Glory, but this man Moses born of woman desired to see God's Glory. The angels arose in wrath and excitement to kill Moses, and he came near to death. God intervened in a cloud to protect Moses, as  reports, "And the Lord descended in the cloud." God protected Moses with the hollow of God's hand so that he would not die, as  reports, "And it shall come to pass, while My Glory passes by, that I will put you in a cleft of the rock, and I will cover you with My hand." Moses began to cry with a loud voice, and Moses said the words of  "O Lord, O Lord, a God full of compassion and gracious . . . ." Moses asked God to pardon the iniquities of the people in connection with the Golden Calf. God told Moses that if he had asked God then to pardon the iniquities of all Israel, even to the end of all generations, God would have done so, as it was the appropriate time. But Moses had asked for pardon with reference to the Golden Calf, so God told Moses that it would be according to his words, as  says, "And the Lord said, 'I have pardoned according to your word.'"

Rabbi Jose ben Halafta employed  to help explain how God can be called "the Place." Rav Huna explained that it is because God is the Place of the world (the world is contained in God, and not God in the world). Rabbi Isaac taught that reading , "The eternal God is a dwelling place," one cannot know whether God is the dwelling-place of God's world or whether God's world is God's dwelling-place. But reading , "Lord, You have been our dwelling-place," it follows that God is the dwelling-place of God's world, but God's world is not God's dwelling-place. And Rabbi Abba ben Judan taught that God is like a warrior riding a horse with the warrior's robes flowing over on both sides of the horse. The horse is subsidiary to the rider, but the rider is not subsidiary to the horse. Thus  says, "You ride upon Your horses, upon Your chariots of victory."

Exodus chapter 34
Rabban Joḥanan ben Zakkai compared it to the case of a king who took a wife and paid for the paper for the marriage contract, the scribe, and the wedding dress. But when he saw her cavorting with one of his servants, he became angry with her and sent her away. Her agent came to the king and argued that she had been raised among servants and was thus familiar with them. The king told the agent that if he wished that the king should become reconciled with her, the agent should pay for the paper and the scribe for a new wedding contract and the king would sign it. Similarly, when Moses spoke to God after the Israelites committed the sin of the Golden Calf, Moses argued that God knew that God had brought the Israelites out of Egypt, a house of idolatry.

In , Moses foretold that "A prophet will the Lord your God raise up for you . . . like me," and Rabbi Joḥanan thus taught that prophets would have to be, like Moses, strong, wealthy, wise, and meek. Strong, for  says of Moses, "he spread the tent over the tabernacle," and a Master taught that Moses himself spread it, and  reports, "Ten cubits shall be the length of a board." Wealthy, as  reports God's instruction to Moses, "Carve yourself two tablets of stone," and the Rabbis interpreted the verse to teach that the chips would belong to Moses. Wise, for Rav and Samuel both said that 50 gates of understanding were created in the world, and all but one were given to Moses, for  said of Moses, "You have made him a little lower than God." Meek, for  reports, "Now the man Moses was very meek."

The Sifre taught that  shows Attributes of God that people should emulate.  enjoins people "to love the Lord your God, to walk in all His ways."

The Jerusalem Talmud taught that if, on the Day of Judgment, the greater part of one's record consists of honorable deeds, one will inherit the Garden of Eden, but if the greater part consists of transgressions, one will inherit Gehenna. If the record is evenly balanced, Rabbi Yosé ben Ḥaninah read  not to say "forgives sins," but rather "forgives [a] sin." That is to say, God tears up one document recording a sin, so that one's honorable deeds then will outweigh one's sins and one can inherit the Garden of Eden. Reading , "To You, O Lord, belongs steadfast love. For You requite a person according to his work," Rabbi Eleazar argued that  does not say "his deed," but "like his deed," teaching that if a person is lacking in good deeds, God will give the person one of God's own, so that the person's merits will outweigh the person's sins. Rabbi Eleazar read  to teach that God tips the scale in favor of mercy so that a person can inherit the Garden of Eden.

At first, God is righteous, and in the end, gracious (when God sees that the world cannot endure strict justice). At first, God "render[s] to every man according to his work," but at the end, "to You, O Lord, belongs mercy." Similarly, Ilfi (or others say Ilfa) contrasted two Attributes.  reports that God is "abundant in goodness," and then  says, "and in truth." Ilfi asked how both could be true. At first, God exhibits "truth," and at the end, "abundant . . . goodness." But  teaches that God drew a prayer shawl around God's self like the leader of congregational prayers and showed Moses the order of prayer. God told Moses that whenever Israel sins, they should recite the passage in  containing God's 13 Attributes, and God would forgive them.

Rabbi Elazar resolved the apparent contradiction by teaching that God absolves those who repent and does not absolve those who do not repent. Therefore, both "repentance" and "absolve" were mentioned at Mount Sinai.	  

The Rabbi answered that this means that God is long-suffering in two ways: God is long-suffering toward the righteous, that is, God delays payment of their reward (until the World To Come); and God is also long-suffering toward the wicked, that is, God does not punish them immediately (waiting until the World To Come).

The Torah answered that the man whom God sought to create would be limited in days and full of anger, and would come into the power of sin. Unless God would be long-suffering with him, the Torah continued, it would be well for man not to come into the world. God asked the Torah whether it was for nothing that God is called (echoing ) "slow to anger" and "abounding in love." God then set about making man.

," Rabbi Abba bar Memel taught that in response to the request of Moses to know God's Name, God told Moses that God is called according to God's work — sometimes Scripture calls God "Almighty God," "Lord of Hosts," "God," or "Lord." When God suspends judgment for a person's sins, Scripture calls God "El Shadday" ("Almighty God"), and when God is merciful towards the world, Scripture calls God "Adonai" ("Lord"), for "Adonai" refers to the Attribute of Mercy, as  says: "The Lord, the Lord (Adonai, Adonai), God, merciful and gracious."

In a Baraita, the House of Shammai taught that on the great Day of Judgment at the end of days, people will be divided into three groups: wholly righteous people, wholly wicked people, and middling people. The House of Hillel taught that the God Whom  describes as "abundant in kindness" will tilt the scales in favor of kindness, so that middling people will not have to pass through Gehenna.

A Baraita taught that when Moses ascended to receive the Torah from God, Moses found God writing "longsuffering" among the words with which  describes God. Moses asked God whether God meant longsuffering with the righteous, to which God replied that God is longsuffering even with the wicked. Moses exclaimed that God could let the wicked perish, but God cautioned Moses that Moses would come to desire God's longsuffering for the wicked. Later, when the Israelites sinned at the incident of the spies, God reminded Moses that he had suggested that God be longsuffering only with the righteous, to which Moses recounted that God had promised to be longsuffering even with the wicked. And that is why Moses in  cited to God that God is "slow to anger."

Elsewhere, the Mishnah interpreted  to allow money in exchange for redemption of a first-born son to be given to any priest; that if a person weaves the hair of a firstborn donkey into a sack, the sack must be burned; that they did not redeem with the firstborn of a donkey an animal that falls within both wild and domestic categories (a ); and that one was prohibited to derive benefit in any quantity at all from an unredeemed firstborn donkey. And elsewhere, the Mishnah taught that before the Israelites constructed the Tabernacle, the firstborns performed sacrificial services, but after the Israelites constructed the Tabernacle, the Priests performed the services.

The Mishnah thus concluded that a cow that gave birth to a calf like a donkey and a donkey that gave birth to a foal like a horse are exempt from their offspring being considered a firstborn.

Rabbi Akiva interpreted  to prohibit plowing prior to the Sabbatical year that would reap benefits in the Sabbatical year and to prohibit reaping in the year after the Sabbatical year produce that grew in the Sabbatical year. Rabbi Ishamel argued, however, that  applied to the Sabbath, and limited its prohibition to plowing and reaping not elsewhere required by commandment.

The Mishnah taught that the prohibitions of  that "seven days shall there be no leaven found in your houses" and of  that "no leaven shall be seen in all your territory" applied to the first Passover; while at the second Passover, one could have both leavened and unleavened bread in one's house. And the Mishnah taught that for the first Passover, one was required to recite the Hallel when the Passover lamb was eaten; while the second Passover did not require the reciting of Hallel when the Passover lamb was eaten. But both the first and second Passovers required the reciting of Hallel when the Passover lambs were offered, and both Passover lambs were eaten roasted with unleavened bread and bitter herbs. And both the first and second Passovers took precedence over the Sabbath.

In medieval Jewish interpretation
The parashah is discussed in these medieval Jewish sources:

Exodus chapter 32
Rashi reported an interpretation by Rabbi Moshe ha-Darshan that since the Levites were submitted in atonement for the firstborn who had practiced idolatry when they worshipped the Golden Calf (in ), and  calls idol worship "sacrifices to the dead," and in  Moses called one afflicted with tzaraat "as one dead," and  required those afflicted with tzaraat to shave, therefore God required the Levites to shave as well.

The  compared Moses to Noah and found Moses superior. Moses protested that the world would say that he had killed Israel and did to them as Noah did to his generation. For when God bade Noah to save himself and his household from the Flood, Noah did not intercede on behalf of his generation, but let them perish. It is for this reason that Scripture names the waters of the Flood after Noah, as  says, "For this is as the waters of Noah to me." Thus, Moses sought mercy for his people, and God indeed showed them mercy.

Reading  "The Lord spoke . . . in the Sinai Desert . . . on the first of the month . . . 'Take a census,'" Rashi taught that God counted the Israelites often because they were dear to God. On the first of Nisan, the Tabernacle was erected, and on the first of Iyar, God counted them.

Baḥya ibn Paquda taught that because God showed special goodness to the Israelites among the peoples, taking them out of Egypt and bringing them to the land of Canaan, God put them under an obligation of service, beyond the universal service expected of all peoples. This consists in obedience to commandments that have their basis in revelation alone, beyond moral duties called for by reason. Baḥya taught that whoever assumed service for the glory of God was favored by God with special bounties, and God held them to an obligation of additional service beside the service due from others. Let him come to me.' And all the descendants of Levi gathered themselves together to him." God then showed the Levites additional favor and chose from among them Aaron and his sons to be priests. God charged the Levites with particular precepts in addition to those God gave to the rest of the nation, and promised them a great reward in the life hereafter.

Exodus chapter 34

But Baḥya cautioned that one must be careful not to take descriptions of God's attributes literally or in a physical sense. Rather, one must know that they are metaphors, geared to what we are capable of grasping with our powers of understanding, because of our urgent need to know God. But God is infinitely greater and loftier than all of these attributes.

People call God "merciful" if God improves the condition of someone whom people pity. People attribute to God "mercy" and "compassion," although Halevi saw these Attributes as weaknesses of the soul and a quick movement of nature. Halevi argued that this cannot actually be applied to God, who is a just Judge, ordaining poverty for one and wealth to another. God's nature, Halevi argued, remains unaffected, having no sympathy for one, nor anger for another. God decides according to law, making some people happy and others miserable. God appears to people, as we observe God's actions, sometimes (in the words of ) as a "merciful and compassionate God," and sometimes (in the words of ) as "a jealous and revengeful God," while in reality God never changes. Halevi divided all Attributes (apart from the Tetragrammaton) into three classes: creative, relative, and negative. And he identified as creative Attributes those derived from God's effect on the world, such as making poor and rich, lifting up or casting down, "merciful and compassionate," "jealous and revengeful," "strong and almighty," and the like.

Similarly, Maimonides equated knowledge of God's Attributes with knowledge of God's works. Maimonides thus concluded that the ways that Moses wished to know, and which God taught him, were God's actions. Maimonides equated these with what the Sages called "Attributes", noting that the Talmud spoke of the 13 "Attributes" of God. And the Mishnah also used the term in reference to man, saying, for example, "There are four different sorts among those who go to the house of learning," and, "There are four different traits among those who give charity." Maimonides argued that the Sages did not mean that God really possesses Attributes, but that God performs actions similar to human actions that in humans flow from certain Attributes and certain mental dispositions, whereas God has no such dispositions. Although Moses was shown all God's goodness, that is, all God's works,  mentions only the 13 Attributes, because they include those acts of God that refer to the creation and the government of mankind, and to know these acts was the principal object of the prayer of Moses. That is, Moses sought understanding of God's ways in governing the Israelites, so that Moses might act similarly. Maimonides concluded that "the ways" used in the Bible are identical with the "Attributes" used in the Mishnah, denoting the acts emanating from God in reference to the universe.

The , however, found in God's Attributes components of God's essential Name. In its revealed form, it is written as the four-letter Name of God, the Tetragrammaton, but in its undisclosed form it is written in other letters, and this undisclosed form represents the most Recondite of all. They all combine in one composite Name. When people were more reverent, the priests openly enunciated the Name in the hearing of all, but after irreverence became widespread, the Name became concealed under other letters. At the time when the Name was disclosed, the priest would concentrate his mind on its deep and inner meaning, and he would utter the Name in such a way as to accord with that meaning. But when irreverence became common in the world, he would conceal all within the written letters. It is for this reason that  says simply "saying", instead of the imperative form "say", in a reference to the hidden letters within the words of the Priestly Blessing. The word ,  has in its letters the numerical value of 248 minus one ( equals 1;  equals 40;  equals 6;  equals 200; and 1 + 40 + 6 + 200 = 247), equal to the number of a man's bodily parts, excepting the one part on which all the rest depend.

In modern interpretation
The parashah is discussed in these modern sources:

Exodus chapter 30
 reports that "the shekel is twenty gerahs." This table translates units of weight used in the Bible into their modern equivalents:

Exodus chapter 31
Noting that  commands the Israelites to observe the Sabbath at the end of the instructions for the Tabernacle and then  commands the Israelites to observe the Sabbath just before the account of the Tabernacle's construction, Gunther Plaut concluded that the Sabbath was the bridge that connected the building of the Tabernacle with its deeper purpose.

In 1950, the Committee on Jewish Law and Standards of Conservative Judaism ruled: "Refraining from the use of a motor vehicle is an important aid in the maintenance of the Sabbath spirit of repose. Such restraint aids, moreover, in keeping the members of the family together on the Sabbath. However where a family resides beyond reasonable walking distance from the synagogue, the use of a motor vehicle for the purpose of synagogue attendance shall in no wise be construed as a violation of the Sabbath but, on the contrary, such attendance shall be deemed an expression of loyalty to our faith. . . . [I]n the spirit of a living and developing Halachah responsive to the changing needs of our people, we declare it to be permitted to use electric lights on the Sabbath for the purpose of enhancing the enjoyment of the Sabbath, or reducing personal discomfort in the performance of a mitzvah."

Exodus chapter 33
MacDonald wrote that the term for milk could easily be the word for "fat", and the word for honey could indicate not bees' honey but a sweet syrup made from fruit. The expression evoked a general sense of the bounty of the land and suggested an ecological richness exhibited in a number of ways, not just with milk and honey. MacDonald noted that the expression was always used to describe a land that the people of Israel had not yet experienced, and thus characterized it as always a future expectation.

Everett Fox noted that "glory" and "stubbornness" (kaved lev) are leading words throughout the book of Exodus that give it a sense of unity.

Exodus chapter 34
Propp thus argued that  is one long, full Name for God. Propp speculated that  might have been God's revelation of a chant that Israelites could use in future crises to remind God of God's transgenerational mercy.

Richard Elliott Friedman observed that the Yahwist's formula in  emphasizes the merciful — mercy, grace, and kindness — over the just side of God. In contrast, Friedman noted, the Priestly source never uses these or several other related words, emphasizing rather the just side of God. Friedman argued that this then is an important example of the pervasive way in which the Bible became more than the sum of its parts when the Redactor combined the sources, bringing the two sides together in a new balance in the final version of the Torah, conveying a picture of God Who is torn between justice and mercy, which Friedman argued has been a central element of the conception of God in Judaism and Christianity ever since.

The Chofetz Chaim told that there was once a wealthy businessman whose poor nephew pleaded with him for a job. The businessman gave the nephew a job, and wrote out a list of tasks describing the nephew's responsibilities. The businessman exhorted the nephew to review the list every day. After a while, the businessman summoned his nephew to ask him what he was doing for the business. The nephew said that he had done everything that the businessman had asked. The businessman pressed the nephew for details. The nephew replied that every day, he recited the list of tasks that the businessman gave him and remembered the list by heart. The businessman asked whether the nephew had done any of the tasks. The nephew answered sheepishly that he thought that since his uncle was the boss, it would be enough for him simply to repeat the list aloud. The businessman called the nephew a fool and explained that the list was only to remind the nephew what to do. Similarly, taught the Chofetz Chaim, the 13 Attributes, while given to Jews to be recited as a prayer, are fundamentally guidelines for how to walk in God's ways.

Trible wrote that the Hebrew noun for "compassion" or "mercy" (rahamim) thus connotes both a "mode of being and the locus of that mode," as in the Hebrew the concrete meaning of "womb" expanded to encompass the abstractions of "compassion," "mercy," and "love," the verb "to show mercy", and the adjective "merciful".

Julius Wellhausen conceived of early Israelite religion as linked to nature's annual cycle and believed that Scripture only later connected the festivals to historical events like the Exodus from Egypt. James Kugel reported that modern scholars generally agreed that Passover reflects two originally separate holidays arising out of the annual harvest cycle. One Festival involved the sacrificing and eating of an animal from the flock, the  sacrifice, which arose among shepherds who sacrificed in the light of the full moon of the month that marked the vernal equinox and the end of winter (as directed in ) to bring Divine favor for a safe and prosperous summer for the rest of the flock. The shepherds slaughtered the animal at home, as the rite also stipulated that some of the animal's blood be daubed on the doorposts and lintel of the house (as directed in ) to ward off evil. The rite prescribed that no bone be broken (as directed in ) so as not to bring evil on the flock from which the sacrifice came. A second Festival — the Festival of Unleavened Bread — involved farmers eating unleavened barley bread for seven days when the winter's barley crop had reached maturity and was ready for harvest. Modern scholars believe that the absence of yeast in the bread indicated purity (as in ). Modern scholars suggest that the farmers' Festival of Unleavened Bread and the shepherds' Passover later merged into a single festival, Passover moved from the home to the Temple, and the combined festival was explicitly connected to the Exodus (as in ).

Commandments

According to Sefer ha-Chinuch, there are 4 positive and 5 negative commandments in the parashah:

To give a half shekel annually
A Kohen must wash his hands and feet before service.
To prepare the anointing oil
Not to anoint a stranger with anointing oil
Not to reproduce the anointing oil
Not to reproduce the incense formula
Not to eat or drink anything from an offering to an idol
To let the land lie fallow in the Sabbatical year
Not to cook meat and milk together

Maimonides, however, attributed to this parashah only the following 4 positive and 3 negative commandments:

To give a half shekel annually
A Kohen must wash his hands and feet before service.
To prepare the anointing oil
Not to reproduce the anointing oil
Not to anoint a stranger with anointing oil
Not to reproduce the incense formula
To let the land lie fallow in the Sabbatical year

In the liturgy

Some Jews sing of the Sabbath's holiness, reflecting , as part of the Baruch El Elyon song sung in connection with the Sabbath day meal.

And thereafter, some quote  as they study Pirkei Avot chapter 6 on a succeeding Sabbath between Passover and Rosh Hashanah.

And the custom of the Ari, accepted in most but not all communities, is to recite them after removing the Torah from the Ark on Passover, Shavuot, Rosh Hashanah, Yom Kippur, Sukkot, and Hoshana Rabbah.

The weekly maqam
In the Weekly Maqam, Sephardi Jews each week base the songs of the services on the content of that week's parashah. For Parashat Ki Tisa, Sephardi Jews apply Maqam Hijaz, the maqam that expresses mourning and sorrow, as the parashah contains the episode of the Golden Calf, a sad and embarrassing episode in the history of the Israelite people.

Haftarah

Generally
The haftarah for the parashah is:
for Ashkenazi Jews: 
for Sephardi Jews (as well as some Ashenazic communities such as Frankfurt am Main):

Connection to the Parashah
Both the parashah and the haftarah in First Kings describe God's prophet confronting idolatry to restore worship of God, the parashah in Moses' anger at the Golden Calf, and the haftarah in the prophet Elijah's confrontation with the prophets of Baal. In both the parashah and the haftarah, the prophet was on a mountain; the prophet invoked the names of Abraham and Isaac in prayer to God; sound is observed; the prophet called on the Israelites to choose between God and the false god; and God manifested God's choice.

On Shabbat Parah
On Shabbat Parah, the Sabbath of the red heifer, Jews read , which describes the rites of purification using the red heifer. Similarly, the haftarah in Ezekiel also describes purification. In both the special reading and the haftarah in Ezekiel, sprinkled water cleansed the Israelites.

Notes

Further reading
The parashah has parallels or is discussed in these sources:

Biblical
 (three pilgrim festivals).
 (drinking the accursed thing);  (Passover);  (Attributes of God; punishing children for fathers' sin);  (sacrifices to another god; zealots kill apostates; zealots rewarded with priestly standing; plague as punishment; leader makes atonement);  (Passover, Shavuot);  (Sukkot).
 (cult object from molten jewelry);  (Sukkot).
 (Sukkot);  (golden calves);  (northern feast like Sukkot).
 (keeping the Sabbath);  (universally-observed Sabbath).
 (31:29–30 in NJPS) (not punishing children for fathers' sin).
 (idols from molten jewelry);  (not punishing children for fathers' sin);  (Sukkot).
 (God's Attributes).
 (Sukkot).
 ("Show me Your ways");  ("Teach me Your way");  (cassia);  (ransom to God);  (God's book);  (blot out of the book of the living);  (God drove out the nations before them);  (God drove out the nations before them);  ("Teach me . . . Your way");  (holy anointing oil);  (God's covert; God covering with God's limb);  (Israel as God's inheritance);  (God's rest);  (God spoke to Moses from a cloud);  ("The Lord is full of compassion and gracious, slow to anger, and plenteous in mercy");  (God's truth);  ("Teach me . . . the way");  (anointing oil);  (God's book);  (God's Attributes);  (God's separate treatment of Israel).
 (Sukkot).
 (Sukkot).
 (Sukkot);  (Sukkot);  (three Pilgrim festivals).

Early nonrabbinic

Philo. Allegorical Interpretation 2:15:54–55; 3: 15:46, 31:95, 32:101, 48:140–42; That the Worse Is Wont To Attack the Better 44:159–60; On the Posterity of Cain and His Exile 4:13, 5:15–16, 41:136, 46:158, 48:169; On the Giants 5:2–3, 12:53–55; On the Unchangeableness of God 24:109–10; Concerning Noah's Work as a Planter 6:26; On Drunkenness 15:66–67, 24:96; On the Migration of Abraham 2:7–8, 15:84–85, 31:170–71; Who Is the Heir of Divine Things? 4:19–20, 35:167–68, 38:186–39:189, 41:196; On Flight and Finding 17:88–90, 29:165; On the Change of Names 2:7–10, 17:108–09; On the Life of Moses 2:49:270–74; The Special Laws 3:22:124–27. Alexandria, Egypt, early 1st Century CE. In, e.g., The Works of Philo: Complete and Unabridged, New Updated Edition. Translated by Charles Duke Yonge, pages 43, 55, 61, 66, 129, 133, 145, 148–49, 153, 156, 167, 193, 212, 215, 253, 261, 269, 277, 290–92, 329, 336, 341, 350, 515, 606. Peabody, Massachusetts: Hendrickson Publishers, 1993.
Romans  1st Century. ("I will have mercy on whom I have mercy").
Mark  (Passover). Circa 70 CE.
Matthew  (Passover). Circa 70–100 CE.
Luke  (Passover). Circa 80–150 CE.
John  (Sukkot).

Classical rabbinic
Mishnah: Sheviit 1:1–4; Challah 4:9; Shabbat 1:1–24:5; Pesachim 1:1–10:9; Shekalim 1:1–4:9; Yoma 3:10; Sukkah 1:1–5:8; Beitzah 1:1–5:7; Megillah 3:4, 4:10; Avot 5:6, 13–14; Zevachim 2:1, 9:7; Menachot 9:2; Chullin 8:4; Bekhorot 1:1–7; Temurah 7:4; Keritot 1:1–2. Land of Israel, circa 200 CE. In, e.g., The Mishnah: A New Translation. Translated by Jacob Neusner, pages 68–69, 157, 179–208, 229–58, 269, 279–99, 321, 324, 686–88, 721, 751, 781, 788–89, 835–37. New Haven: Yale University Press, 1988.
Tosefta: Challah 2:9; Shabbat 1:1–17:29; Pisha (Pesachim) 1:1–10:13; Shekalim 1:1–3:1; Kippurim (Yoma) 1:18, 2:1, 4:9, 13–14; Sukkah 1:1–4:28; Yom Tov (Beitzah) 1:1–4:11; Megillah 3:1, 36; Sotah 3:10, 6:6, 11; Bava Kamma 7:4; Sanhedrin 4:9, 13:3; Avodah Zarah 3:19, 4:6; Menachot 1:12, 7:1; Parah 4:4. Land of Israel, circa 250 CE. In, e.g., The Tosefta: Translated from the Hebrew, with a New Introduction. Translated by Jacob Neusner, volume 1, pages 339, 357–427, 471–539, 546, 548, 564–604, 644, 652, 700–01, 841, 856, 860; volume 2, pages 986–87, 1160, 1182, 1189, 1273, 1276, 1409, 1433, 1754. Peabody, Massachusetts: Hendrickson Publishers, 2002.
Mekhilta According to Rabbi Ishmael 81:1. Land of Israel, late 4th Century. In, e.g., Mekhilta According to Rabbi Ishmael. Translated by Jacob Neusner, volume 2, pages 251–57. Atlanta: Scholars Press, 1988.
Jerusalem Talmud: Peah 3a, 8a, 10a, 22b, 31b; Sheviit 1a, 4a; Bikkurim 1a, 23a; Shabbat 1a–113b; Eruvin 33b; Pesachim 1a–86a; Shekalim 1a–61b; Yoma 21b, 23b, 30a, 49b, 55a, 57a; Sukkah 1a–33b; Beitzah 1a–49b; Rosh Hashanah 7b; Taanit 10a, 22b, 26a; Megillah 33b, 40a; Chagigah 2b–3a, 4a, 8a, 19a; Yevamot 62a, 68a; Nedarim 9b, 12b; Nazir 25b; Sotah 39a, 40a; Kiddushin 24a; Sanhedrin 30a, 40b, 46a, 48b, 56b, 61a, 64a; Shevuot 21a; Avodah Zarah 19a, 25a, 26a; Horayot 13a–b. Tiberias, Land of Israel, circa 400 CE. In, e.g., Talmud Yerushalmi. Edited by Chaim Malinowitz, Yisroel Simcha Schorr, and Mordechai Marcus, volumes 3, 6a, 12–15, 17–27, 30, 33, 35, 37, 40, 44–46, 48–49. Brooklyn: Mesorah Publications, 2006–2020. And in, e.g., The Jerusalem Talmud: A Translation and Commentary. Edited by Jacob Neusner and translated by Jacob Neusner, Tzvee Zahavy, B. Barry Levy, and Edward Goldman. Peabody, Massachusetts: Hendrickson Publishers, 2009.
Midrash Tanḥuma Ki Sisa. 5th–10th centuries. In, e.g., The Metsudah Midrash Tanchuma: Shemos II. Translated and annotated by Avrohom Davis, edited by Yaakov Y.H. Pupko, volume 4 (Shemos volume 2), pages 206–338. Monsey, New York: Eastern Book Press, 2004.

Babylonian Talmud: Berakhot 7a–b, 10b, 30b, 32a–b, 55a, 62b, 63b; Shabbat 10b, 30a, 33a, 69b–70a, 86a, 87a, 89a, 119b, 132a; Eruvin 22a, 54a, 96a; Pesachim 2a–121b; Shekalim 2a–22b; Yoma 3b, 22a, 28a, 32b, 36b–37a, 43b, 45a, 66b, 85b–86b; Sukkah 2a–56b; Beitzah 2a–40b; Rosh Hashanah 9a, 16b, 17b; Taanit 8a, 21b, 27b, 28b; Megillah 6b, 10b, 15a–b, 19b, 25a–b, 29b–30a, 31a; Moed Katan 3b–4a, 9a, 15a, 16b, 18b; Chagigah 6b, 11b, 12b, 16a; Yevamot 6b–7a, 49b, 62a, 72a; Ketubot 30a, 31a, 34a, 106a; Nedarim 10b, 32a, 33a, 38a; Nazir 47a; Sotah 13b–14a; Gittin 60b; Kiddushin 17a, 29a–b, 33b; Bava Kamma 34b, 50a, 52b, 55a, 71a, 92a, 112a, 119a; Bava Batra 10b, 15a–b, 75a; Sanhedrin 7a, 13a, 27b, 35b, 38b, 56b, 60b, 63a, 74a, 78b, 83b, 102a, 108a, 110a, 111a; Makkot 8b, 11a, 12a, 13a, 14b, 23a–24a; Shevuot 10b, 15a, 39a; Avodah Zarah 8a, 10b, 44a, 53b; Horayot 4a–b, 6b, 11b; Zevachim 15b, 18a, 19b, 21a, 112b; Menachot 5b–6a, 21b, 35b, 36b, 53b, 72a, 84b, 87b–88a, 89a, 99b, 101b; Chullin 62b, 106b, 114a, 115a, 139b; Bekhorot 3a, 6a, 50a, 51b; Arakhin 4a, 15b, 16b; Temurah 14b, 16a; Keritot 2a, 3a, 5a–6b; Meilah 19a; Niddah 40a, 41a. Sasanian Empire, 6th Century. In, e.g., Talmud Bavli. Edited by Yisroel Simcha Schorr, Chaim Malinowitz, and Mordechai Marcus, 72 volumes. Brooklyn: Mesorah Publications, 2006.

Medieval

Exodus Rabbah 39:1–47:9. 10th Century. In, e.g., Midrash Rabbah: Exodus. Translated by Simon M. Lehrman, volume 3, pages 458–545. London: Soncino Press, 1939.
Solomon ibn Gabirol. A Crown for the King, 26:322–23. Spain, 11th Century. Translated by David R. Slavitt, pages 42–43. New York: Oxford University Press, 1998.
Rashi. Commentary. Exodus 30–34. Troyes, France, late 11th Century. In, e.g., Rashi. The Torah: With Rashi's Commentary Translated, Annotated, and Elucidated. Translated and annotated by Yisrael Isser Zvi Herczeg, volume 2, pages 423–86. Brooklyn: Mesorah Publications, 1994.
Rashbam. Commentary on the Torah. Troyes, early 12th century. In, e.g., Rashbam's Commentary on Exodus: An Annotated Translation. Edited and translated by Martin I. Lockshin, pages 384–424. Atlanta: Scholars Press, 1997.
Judah Halevi. Kuzari. 1:97; 2:2, 26, 80; 4:3, 15. Toledo, Spain, 1130–1140. In, e.g., Jehuda Halevi. Kuzari: An Argument for the Faith of Israel. Introduction by Henry Slonimsky, pages 68–69, 83, 105, 132, 211, 221–22. New York: Schocken, 1964.

Abraham ibn Ezra. Commentary on the Torah. France, 1153. In, e.g., Ibn Ezra's Commentary on the Pentateuch: Exodus (Shemot). Translated and annotated by H. Norman Strickman and Arthur M. Silver, volume 2, pages 628–729. New York: Menorah Publishing Company, 1996.
Maimonides. Guide for the Perplexed, part 1, chapters 4, 8, 15, 16, 18, 21, 37, 46, 48, 54, 64, 66; part 2, chapters 32, 45, 47; part 3, chapters 17, 24, 32, 41, 45, 48, 49, 51, 53. Cairo, Egypt, 1190. In, e.g., Moses Maimonides. The Guide for the Perplexed. Translated by Michael Friedländer, pages 3, 17, 21, 26–27, 30–31, 52–53, 61, 65, 75–76, 96, 98, 221, 245, 248, 287, 304, 323, 346, 358, 371, 380, 385, 392–93. New York: Dover Publications, 1956.
Hezekiah ben Manoah. Hizkuni. France, circa 1240. In, e.g., Chizkiyahu ben Manoach. Chizkuni: Torah Commentary. Translated and annotated by Eliyahu Munk, volume 3, pages 611–44. Jerusalem: Ktav Publishers, 2013.

Nachmanides. Commentary on the Torah. Jerusalem, circa 1270. In, e.g., Ramban (Nachmanides): Commentary on the Torah. Translated by Charles B. Chavel, volume 2, pages 510–94. New York: Shilo Publishing House, 1973.
Zohar, part 2, pages 187b–193b. Spain, late 13th Century. In, e.g., The Zohar. Translated by Harry Sperling and Maurice Simon. 5 volumes. London: Soncino Press, 1934.
Bahya ben Asher. Commentary on the Torah. Spain, early 14th century. In, e.g., Midrash Rabbeinu Bachya: Torah Commentary by Rabbi Bachya ben Asher. Translated and annotated by Eliyahu Munk, volume 4, pages 1311–417. Jerusalem: Lambda Publishers, 2003.
Jacob ben Asher (Baal Ha-Turim). Commentary on the Torah. Early 14th century. In, e.g., Baal Haturim Chumash: Shemos/Exodus. Translated by Eliyahu Touger, edited and annotated by Avie Gold, volume 2, pages 881–927. Brooklyn: Mesorah Publications, 2000.
Isaac ben Moses Arama. Akedat Yizhak (The Binding of Isaac). Late 15th century. In, e.g., Yitzchak Arama. Akeydat Yitzchak: Commentary of Rabbi Yitzchak Arama on the Torah. Translated and condensed by Eliyahu Munk, volume 1, pages 483–519. New York, Lambda Publishers, 2001.

Modern
Isaac Abravanel. Commentary on the Torah. Italy, between 1492–1509. In, e.g., Abarbanel: Selected Commentaries on the Torah: Volume 2: Shemos/Exodus. Translated and annotated by Israel Lazar, pages 369–403. Brooklyn: CreateSpace, 2015.

Abraham Saba. Ẓeror ha-Mor (Bundle of Myrrh). Fez, Morocco, circa 1500. In, e.g., Tzror Hamor: Torah Commentary by Rabbi Avraham Sabba. Translated and annotated by Eliyahu Munk, volume 3, pages 1147–220. Jerusalem, Lambda Publishers, 2008.
Niccolò Machiavelli. The Prince, chapter 6. Florence, Italy, 1532.
Obadiah ben Jacob Sforno. Commentary on the Torah. Venice, 1567. In, e.g., Sforno: Commentary on the Torah. Translation and explanatory notes by Raphael Pelcovitz, pages 444–73. Brooklyn: Mesorah Publications, 1997.
Moses Cordovero (the Ramak). Tomer Devorah (The Palm Tree of Deborah). Venice, 1588. In, e.g., Moshe Cordevero. The Palm Tree of Devorah. Translated by Moshe Miller. Southfield, Michigan: Targum Press, 1993. (advocating the imitation of God through the acquisition of the Divine Attributes of ).
Moshe Alshich. Commentary on the Torah. Safed, circa 1593. In, e.g., Moshe Alshich. Midrash of Rabbi Moshe Alshich on the Torah. Translated and annotated by Eliyahu Munk, volume 2, pages 563–606. New York, Lambda Publishers, 2000.
Shlomo Ephraim Luntschitz. Kli Yakar. Lublin, 1602. In, e.g., Kli Yakar: Shemos. Translated by Elihu Levine, volume 2, pages 273–344. Southfield, Michigan: Targum Press/Feldheim Publishers, 2007.
Avraham Yehoshua Heschel. Commentaries on the Torah. Cracow, Poland, mid 17th century. Compiled as Chanukat HaTorah. Edited by Chanoch Henoch Erzohn. Piotrkow, Poland, 1900. In Avraham Yehoshua Heschel. Chanukas HaTorah: Mystical Insights of Rav Avraham Yehoshua Heschel on Chumash. Translated by Avraham Peretz Friedman, pages 191–98. Southfield, Michigan: Targum Press/Feldheim Publishers, 2004.

Thomas Hobbes. Leviathan, 1:12; 3:34, 36, 40; 4:45; Review & Conclusion. England, 1651. Reprint edited by C. B. Macpherson, pages 181, 431, 437–38, 460–61, 503–04, 672, 676–77, 723. Harmondsworth, England: Penguin Classics, 1982.
Chaim ibn Attar. Ohr ha-Chaim. Venice, 1742. In Chayim ben Attar. Or Hachayim: Commentary on the Torah. Translated by Eliyahu Munk, volume 2, pages 814–93. Brooklyn: Lambda Publishers, 1999.

Yaakov Culi and Yitzchak Magriso. Me'am Lo'ez. Constantinople, 1746. In Jacob Culi and Yitzchak Magriso. The Torah Anthology: Me'am Lo'ez. Translated by Aryeh Kaplan, volume 9, pages 267–355. Jerusalem: Moznaim Publishing, 1990. And Yitzchak Magriso. The Torah Anthology: Me'am Lo'ez. Translated by Aryeh Kaplan, volume 10, pages 3–174. Jerusalem: Moznaim Publishing, 1991.
Moses Mendelssohn. Jerusalem, § 2. Berlin, 1783. In Jerusalem: Or on Religious Power and Judaism. Translated by Allan Arkush; introduction and commentary by Alexander Altmann, pages 120, 122–23, 129. Hanover, N.H.: Brandeis University Press, 1983.
Nachman of Breslov. Teachings. Bratslav, Ukraine, before 1811. In Rebbe Nachman's Torah: Breslov Insights into the Weekly Torah Reading: Exodus-Leviticus. Compiled by Chaim Kramer, edited by Y. Hall, pages 232–81. Jerusalem: Breslov Research Institute, 2011.

Henry Wadsworth Longfellow The Jewish Cemetery at Newport. Boston, 1854. In Harold Bloom. American Religious Poems, pages 80–81. New York: Library of America, 2006.
George Eliot. Adam Bede, chapters 30, 50. Edinburgh and London: William Blackwood and Sons, 1859. Reprinted, e.g., edited by Carol A. Martin, pages 297, 440. Oxford: Oxford University Press, 2008. Echoing the report of  that "Moses' anger waxed hot," Dinah tells Adam, "even the man Moses, the meekest of men, was wrathful sometimes.").

Shlomo Ganzfried. Kitzur Shulchon Oruch, ch. 140. Hungary, 1864. Translated by Eliyahu Touger, volume 2, page 587. New York: Moznaim Publishing, 1991.

Samson Raphael Hirsch. The Pentateuch: Exodus. Translated by Isaac Levy, volume 2, pages 576–664. Gateshead: Judaica Press, 2nd edition 1999. Originally published as Der Pentateuch uebersetzt und erklaert. Frankfurt, 1867–1878.
Samuel David Luzzatto (Shadal). Commentary on the Torah. Padua, 1871. In, e.g., Samuel David Luzzatto. Torah Commentary. Translated and annotated by Eliyahu Munk, volume 3, pages 867–93. New York: Lambda Publishers, 2012.

Emily Dickinson. Poem 1247 (To pile like Thunder to its close). Circa 1873. Poem 1260 (Because that you are going). Circa 1873. Poem 1719 (God is indeed a jealous God —). 19th Century. Poem 1733 (No man saw awe, nor to his house). 19th Century. In The Complete Poems of Emily Dickinson. Edited by Thomas H. Johnson, pages 547, 551–52, 698, 703. New York: Little, Brown & Co., 1960.
Samson Raphael Hirsch. The Jewish Sabbath. Frankfurt, before 1889. Translated by Ben Josephussoro. 1911. Reprinted Lexington, Kentucky: CreateSpace Independent Publishing Platform, 2014.
Yehudah Aryeh Leib Alter. Sefat Emet. Góra Kalwaria (Ger), Poland, before 1906. Excerpted in The Language of Truth: The Torah Commentary of Sefat Emet. Translated and interpreted by Arthur Green, pages 129–34. Philadelphia: Jewish Publication Society, 1998. Reprinted 2012.
Louis Ginzberg. Legends of the Jews, 3:119–44. Philadelphia: Jewish Publication Society, 1911.
Abraham Isaac Kook. The Moral Principles. The Lights of Holiness. Early 20th Century. In Abraham Isaac Kook: the Lights of Penitence, the Moral Principles, Lights of Holiness, Essays, Letters, and Poems. Translated by Ben Zion Bokser, pages 148, 207. Mahwah, New Jersey: Paulist Press 1978.

Hermann Cohen. Religion of Reason: Out of the Sources of Judaism. Translated with an introduction by Simon Kaplan; introductory essays by Leo Strauss, pages 79–80, 94, 110, 169, 206, 209, 222, 395. New York: Ungar, 1972. Reprinted Atlanta: Scholars Press, 1995. Originally published as Religion der Vernunft aus den Quellen des Judentums. Leipzig: Gustav Fock, 1919.
Alexander Alan Steinbach. Sabbath Queen: Fifty-four Bible Talks to the Young Based on Each Portion of the Pentateuch, pages 64–67. New York: Behrman's Jewish Book House, 1936.
Benno Jacob. The Second Book of the Bible: Exodus. London, 1940. Translated by Walter Jacob, pages 828–1007. Hoboken, New Jersey: KTAV Publishing House, 1992.
The Sabbath Anthology. Edited by Abraham E. Millgram. Philadelphia: The Jewish Publication Society, 1944; reprinted 2018..
Morris Adler, Jacob B. Agus, and Theodore Friedman. "Responsum on the Sabbath." Proceedings of the Rabbinical Assembly, volume 14 (1950), pages 112–88. New York: Rabbinical Assembly of America, 1951. In Proceedings of the Committee on Jewish Law and Standards of the Conservative Movement 1927–1970, volume 3 (Responsa), pages 1109–34. Jerusalem: The Rabbinical Assembly and The Institute of Applied Hallakhah, 1997.

Umberto Cassuto. A Commentary on the Book of Exodus. Jerusalem, 1951. Translated by Israel Abrahams, pages 392–451. Jerusalem: The Magnes Press, The Hebrew University, 1967.

Abraham Joshua Heschel. The Sabbath. New York: Farrar, Straus and Giroux, 1951. Reprinted 2005.
Morris Adler. The World of the Talmud, pages 28–29, 50–51, 91–92. B'nai B'rith Hillel Foundations, 1958. Reprinted Kessinger Publishing, 2007.
Robert C. Dentan, "The Literary Affinities of Exodus Xxxiv 6f." Vetus Testamentum, volume 13 (1963): pages 34–51.
Jacob Liver. "The Half-Shekel Offering in Biblical and Post-Biblical Literature." The Harvard Theological Review, volume 56 (number 3) (1963): pages 173–98.

Bob Dylan. Gates of Eden. Columbia Records, 1965. (Golden Calf).
James Muilenburg. "The Intercession of the Covenant Mediator (Exodus 33:1a,12–17)." In Words and Meanings: Essays Presented to David Winton Thomas. Edited by Peter R. Ackroyd and Barnabas Lindars, pages 159–81. Cambridge: University Press, 1968.
A. Carlebach. "Rabbinic References to Fiscus Judaicus." The Jewish Quarterly Review, New Series, volume 66 (number 1) (July 1975): pages 57–61.
Peter C. Craigie. The Problem of War in the Old Testament, page 27. Grand Rapids, Michigan: William B. Eerdmans Publishing Company, 1978.
Phyllis Trible. God and the Rhetoric of Sexuality, pages 31–59. Philadelphia: Fortress Press, 1978. (God's feminine merciful quality, or rachum).
Elie Munk. The Call of the Torah: An Anthology of Interpretation and Commentary on the Five Books of Moses. Translated by E.S. Mazer, volume 2, pages 426–503. Brooklyn: Mesorah Publications, 1995. Originally published as La Voix de la Thora. Paris: Fondation Samuel et Odette Levy, 1981.
Herbert C. Brichto. "The Worship of the Golden Calf: A Literary Analysis of a Fable on Idolatry." Hebrew Union College Annual, volume 54 (1983): pages 1–44.
Jacob Milgrom. "'You Shall Not Boil a Kid in Its Mother's Milk': An archaeological myth destroyed." Bible Review, volume 1 (number 3) (Fall 1985): pages 48–55.
Pinchas H. Peli. Torah Today: A Renewed Encounter with Scripture, pages 91–94. Washington, D.C.: B'nai B'rith Books, 1987.
Mark S. Smith. The Early History of God: Yahweh and the Other Deities in Ancient Israel, pages xx, 10, 59, 69, 80–81, 101, 108, 112–13, 125, 134–35, 151, 162. New York: HarperSanFrancisco, 1990.
Harvey J. Fields. A Torah Commentary for Our Times: Volume II: Exodus and Leviticus, pages 77–85. New York: UAHC Press, 1991.
Nahum M. Sarna. The JPS Torah Commentary: Exodus: The Traditional Hebrew Text with the New JPS Translation, pages 195–222. Philadelphia: Jewish Publication Society, 1991.
Lawrence Kushner. God Was in This Place and I, I Did Not Know: Finding Self, Spirituality and Ultimate Meaning, pages 31–32, 41. Jewish Lights Publishing, 1993. (the Place; the Golden Calf).
Nehama Leibowitz. New Studies in Shemot (Exodus), volume 2, pages 535–643. Jerusalem: Haomanim Press, 1993. Reprinted as New Studies in the Weekly Parasha. Lambda Publishers, 2010.
Aaron Wildavsky. Assimilation versus Separation: Joseph the Administrator and the Politics of Religion in Biblical Israel, pages 3–4. New Brunswick, New Jersey: Transaction Publishers, 1993.
Walter Brueggemann. "The Book of Exodus." In The New Interpreter's Bible. Edited by Leander E. Keck, volume 1, pages 917–56. Nashville: Abingdon Press, 1994.
Judith S. Antonelli. "The Golden Calf." In In the Image of God: A Feminist Commentary on the Torah, pages 213–20. Northvale, New Jersey: Jason Aronson, 1995.
Ellen Frankel. The Five Books of Miriam: A Woman's Commentary on the Torah, pages 136–41. New York: G. P. Putnam's Sons, 1996.
Marc Gellman. "Gluing the Broken Commandments Back Together." In God's Mailbox: More Stories About Stories in the Bible, pages 68–72. New York: Morrow Junior Books, 1996.
W. Gunther Plaut. The Haftarah Commentary, pages 203–15. New York: UAHC Press, 1996.
Sorel Goldberg Loeb and Barbara Binder Kadden. Teaching Torah: A Treasury of Insights and Activities, pages 140–47. Denver: A.R.E. Publishing, 1997.
Robert Goodman. "Shabbat." In Teaching Jewish Holidays: History, Values, and Activities, pages 1–19. Denver: A.R.E. Publishing, 1997.

Baruch J. Schwartz. "What Really Happened at Mount Sinai? Four biblical answers to one question." Bible Review, volume 13 (number 5) (October 1997).
Mary Doria Russell. Children of God: A Novel, page 428. New York: Villard, 1998. (seeing only God's back).
Susan Freeman. Teaching Jewish Virtues: Sacred Sources and Arts Activities, pages 85–101, 228–40. Springfield, New Jersey: A.R.E. Publishing, 1999. (34–35).
Ellen Lippmann. "The Women Didn't Build the Golden Calf — or Did They?" In The Women's Torah Commentary: New Insights from Women Rabbis on the 54 Weekly Torah Portions. Edited by Elyse Goldstein, pages 164–71. Woodstock, Vermont: Jewish Lights Publishing, 2000.
Exodus to Deuteronomy: A Feminist Companion to the Bible (Second Series). Edited by Athalya Brenner, pages 136–41. Sheffield: Sheffield Academic Press, 2000.
Martin R. Hauge. The Descent from the Mountain: Narrative Patterns in Exodus 19–40. Sheffield: Journal for the Study of the Old Testament Press, 2001.
Avivah Gottlieb Zornberg. The Particulars of Rapture: Reflections on Exodus, pages 398–460. New York: Doubleday, 2001.
Lainie Blum Cogan and Judy Weiss. Teaching Haftarah: Background, Insights, and Strategies, pages 164–72. Denver: A.R.E. Publishing, 2002.
Menachem Davis. The Schottenstein Edition Siddur for the Sabbath and Festivals with an Interlinear Translation, XXVII. Brooklyn: Mesorah Publications, 2002. (Sabbath as a source of holiness).
Michael Fishbane. The JPS Bible Commentary: Haftarot, pages 128–34. Philadelphia: Jewish Publication Society, 2002.
Katharine Doob Sakenfeld. The Meaning of Hesed in the Hebrew Bible: A New Inquiry. Wipf & Stock Publishers, 2002.
Rodger Kamenetz. "The Broken Tablets." In The Lowercase Jew, page 40. Evanston, Illinois: Triquarterly Books, 2003.
Alan Lew. This Is Real and You Are Completely Unprepared: The Days of Awe as a Journey of Transformation, pages 53–55, 136. Boston: Little, Brown and Co., 2003.
Jack M. Sasson. "Should Cheeseburgers Be Kosher? A Different Interpretation of Five Hebrew Words." Bible Review, volume 19 (numbers 6) (December 2003): pages 40–43, 50–51.
Robert Alter. The Five Books of Moses: A Translation with Commentary, pages 486–513. New York: W.W. Norton & Co., 2004.
Karla M. Suomala. Moses and God in Dialogue: Exodus 32–34 in Postbiblical Literature. Peter Lang Inc., International Academic Publishers, 2004.
Jeffrey H. Tigay. "Exodus." In The Jewish Study Bible. Edited by Adele Berlin and Marc Zvi Brettler, pages 179–91. New York: Oxford University Press, 2004.
Jane Liddel-King. "The Golden Calf." European Judaism: A Journal for the New Europe, volume 38 (number 2) (autumn 2005): pages 142–46.
Professors on the Parashah: Studies on the Weekly Torah Reading Edited by Leib Moscovitz, pages 145–49. Jerusalem: Urim Publications, 2005.
W. Gunther Plaut. The Torah: A Modern Commentary: Revised Edition. Revised edition edited by David E.S. Stern, pages 581–610. New York: Union for Reform Judaism, 2006.
William H.C. Propp. Exodus 19–40, volume 2A, pages 317–19, 358–71, 534–623. New York: Anchor Bible, 2006.
Suzanne A. Brody. "Bloody Water." In Dancing in the White Spaces: The Yearly Torah Cycle and More Poems, page 83. Shelbyville, Kentucky: Wasteland Press, 2007.
Esther Jungreis. Life Is a Test, pages 86, 98–99, 144–46, 208–09. Brooklyn: Shaar Press, 2007.
James L. Kugel. How To Read the Bible: A Guide to Scripture, Then and Now, pages 30, 109, 151, 254–55, 257, 262, 281–84, 291, 315, 324–25, 404, 423, 439, 524–25, 606. New York: Free Press, 2007.
Kenton L. Sparks. “‘Enūma Elish’ and Priestly Mimesis: Elite Emulation in Nascent Judaism.” Journal of Biblical Literature, volume 126 (2007): 637–42. (“Priestly Mimesis in the Tabernacle Narrative (Exodus 25–40)”).
Pekka Lindqvist. Sin at Sinai: Early Judaism Encounters Exodus 32. Eisenbrauns, 2008.
Dmitri Slivniak. "The Golden Calf Story: Constructively and Deconstructively." Journal for the Study of the Old Testament, volume 33 (number 1) (September 2008): pages 19–38.
Gloria London. "Why Milk and Meat Don't Mix: A New Explanation for a Puzzling Kosher Law." Biblical Archaeology Review, volume 34 (number 6) (November/December 2008): pages 66–69.
The Torah: A Women's Commentary. Edited by Tamara Cohn Eskenazi and Andrea L. Weiss, pages 495–520. New York: URJ Press, 2008.

Thomas B. Dozeman. Commentary on Exodus, pages 663–756. Grand Rapids, Michigan: William B. Eerdmans Publishing Company, 2009.
Jonathan Goldstein. "The Golden Calf." In Ladies and Gentlemen, the Bible! pages 115–28. New York: Riverhead Books, 2009.
Reuven Hammer. Entering Torah: Prefaces to the Weekly Torah Portion, pages 125–30. New York: Gefen Publishing House, 2009.
Rebecca G.S. Idestrom. "Echoes of the Book of Exodus in Ezekiel." Journal for the Study of the Old Testament, volume 33 (number 4) (June 2009): pages 489–510. (Motifs from Exodus found in Ezekiel, including the call narrative, divine encounters, captivity, signs, plagues, judgment, redemption, tabernacle/temple, are considered.).
Amichai Lau-Lavie. "Mounting Sinai: Parashat Ki Tisa (Exodus 30:11–34:35)." In Torah Queeries: Weekly Commentaries on the Hebrew Bible. Edited by Gregg Drinkwater, Joshua Lesser, and David Shneer; foreword by Judith Plaskow, pages 109–12. New York: New York University Press, 2009.
Bruce Wells. "Exodus." In Zondervan Illustrated Bible Backgrounds Commentary. Edited by John H. Walton, volume 1, pages 257–64. Grand Rapids, Michigan: Zondervan, 2009.

Julie Cadwallader-Staub. Joy. In Face to Face: A Poetry Collection. DreamSeeker Books, 2010. ("land of milk and honey").
Jonathan Sacks. Covenant & Conversation: A Weekly Reading of the Jewish Bible: Exodus: The Book of Redemption, pages 249–76. Jerusalem: Maggid Books, 2010.
Stefan Schorch. "'A Young Goat in Its Mother's Milk'? Understanding an Ancient Prohibition." Vetus Testamentum, volume 60 (number 1) (2010): pages 116–30.
Idan Dershowitz. "A Land Flowing with Fat and Honey." Vetus Testamentum, volume 60 (number 2) (2010): pages 172–76.
Joe Lieberman and David Klinghoffer. The Gift of Rest: Rediscovering the Beauty of the Sabbath. New York: Howard Books, 2011.
James W. Watts. "Aaron and the Golden Calf in the Rhetoric of the Pentateuch." Journal of Biblical Literature, volume 130 (number 3) (fall 2011): pages 417–30.

William G. Dever. The Lives of Ordinary People in Ancient Israel: When Archaeology and the Bible Intersect, page 244. Grand Rapids, Michigan: William B. Eerdmans Publishing Company, 2012.
Shmuel Herzfeld. "Growing Our Congregation: The Numbers Game." In Fifty-Four Pick Up: Fifteen-Minute Inspirational Torah Lessons, pages 123–27. Jerusalem: Gefen Publishing House, 2012.
Daniel S. Nevins. "The Use of Electrical and Electronic Devices on Shabbat." New York: Rabbinical Assembly, 2012.
Torah MiEtzion: New Readings in Tanach: Shemot. Edited by Ezra Bick and Yaakov Beasley, pages 411–77. Jerusalem: Maggid Books, 2012.
Adam Kirsch. "Ancient Laws for Modern Times: When is a tent just a tent and not like a bed or a hat? To update Jewish laws, the rabbis reasoned by analogy." Tablet Magazine. (February 26, 2013). (Shabbat).
Adam Kirsch. "Leave the Jewish People Alone: Rabbis left enforcement of their Talmudic decrees to communal standards and voluntary commitment." Tablet Magazine. (March 5, 2013). (Shabbat).
Adam Kirsch. "Written in the Stars (Or Not): To overcome fated lives, the Talmud's rabbis argued, perform virtuous acts according to Torah." Tablet Magazine. (March 12, 2013). (Shabbat).
Adam Kirsch. "Navigating the Talmud's Alleys: The range of problems and the variety of answers in the study of Oral Law lead to new pathways of reasoning." Tablet Magazine. (March 18, 2013). (Shabbat).
Amiel Ungar. "Tel Aviv and the Sabbath." The Jerusalem Report, volume 24 (number 8) (July 29, 2013): page 37.
Martin Sieff. "The spirit of Elijah: Great leaders have replicated his courage against all odds." The Jerusalem Report, volume 24 (number 23) (February 24, 2014): page 48.
Ester Bloom. "The Crazy New App for Using Your iPhone on Shabbos."  Jewniverse. (October 1, 2014).
Anthony R. Petterson. "The Flying Scroll That Will Not Acquit the Guilty: Exodus 34.7 in Zechariah 5.3." Journal for the Study of the Old Testament, volume 38 (number 3) (March 2014): pages 347–61.
Jonathan Sacks. Lessons in Leadership: A Weekly Reading of the Jewish Bible, pages 105–09. New Milford, Connecticut: Maggid Books, 2015.
"The Crazy New Invention for Using Electricity on Shabbat."  Jewniverse. (April 21, 2015).
"The Hittites: Between Tradition and History." Biblical Archaeology Review, volume 42 (number 2) (March/April 2016): pages 28–40, 68.
Jean-Pierre Isbouts. Archaeology of the Bible: The Greatest Discoveries From Genesis to the Roman Era, page 120. Washington, D.C.: National Geographic, 2016.
Jonathan Sacks. Essays on Ethics: A Weekly Reading of the Jewish Bible, pages 131–36. New Milford, Connecticut: Maggid Books, 2016.
Kenneth Seeskin. Thinking about the Torah: A Philosopher Reads the Bible, pages 101–12. Philadelphia: The Jewish Publication Society, 2016.
Shai Held. The Heart of Torah, Volume 1: Essays on the Weekly Torah Portion: Genesis and Exodus, pages 203–12. Philadelphia: Jewish Publication Society, 2017.
Steven Levy and Sarah Levy. The JPS Rashi Discussion Torah Commentary, pages 65–67. Philadelphia: Jewish Publication Society, 2017.
Joep Dubbink. “‘Don’t Stop Me Now!’ — Exod 32:10 and Yhwh’s Intention to Destroy His Own People.” In Viktor Ber, editor. Nomos and Violence: Dimensions in Bible and Theology. Vienna: LIT Verlag, 2019.

External links

Texts
Masoretic text and 1917 JPS translation
Hear the parashah chanted 
Hear the parashah read in Hebrew

Commentaries

Academy for Jewish Religion, California
Academy for Jewish Religion, New York
Aish.com 
Akhlah: The Jewish Children's Learning Network
American Jewish University — Ziegler School of Rabbinic Studies
Anshe Emes Synagogue, Los Angeles 
Ari Goldwag
Ascent of Safed
Bar-Ilan University
Chabad.org
eparsha.com
G-dcast
The Israel Koschitzky Virtual Beit Midrash
Jewish Agency for Israel
Jewish Theological Seminary
Kabbala Online
Mechon Hadar
MyJewishLearning.com
Ohr Sameach
Orthodox Union
OzTorah, Torah from Australia
Oz Ve Shalom — Netivot Shalom
Pardes from Jerusalem
Professor James L. Kugel
Professor Michael Carasik
Rabbi Dov Linzer
Rabbi Fabian Werbin
Rabbi Jonathan Sacks
RabbiShimon.com 
Rabbi Shlomo Riskin
Rabbi Shmuel Herzfeld
Rabbi Stan Levin 
Reconstructionist Judaism
Sephardic Institute
Shiur.com
613.org Jewish Torah Audio
Talia Davis
Tanach Study Center
Teach613.org, Torah Education at Cherry Hill
TheTorah.com
Torah from Dixie 
Torah.org
TorahVort.com
Union for Reform Judaism
United Synagogue of Conservative Judaism
What's Bothering Rashi?
Yeshivat Chovevei Torah
Yeshiva University

Weekly Torah readings in Adar
Weekly Torah readings from Exodus